Lac de Malsaucy is a lake in the Territoire de Belfort, Franche-Comté, France. The lake with a surface of is 0.64 km² shared by three communes: Evette-Salbert, Lachapelle-sous-Chaux and Sermamagny.

The rock festival Eurockéennes is held each July on an isthmus on the lake.

Malsaucy
Landforms of the Territoire de Belfort